Pygmaclypeatus is a genus of trilobite-like arthropod from the Cambrian aged Chengjiang biota of southern China. It is less than 20 mm in length. The carapace is flat and broad, and slightly shorter than it is wide. The trunk has 6 tergites, along with a terminal pygidium associated with a segmented short tailspine. The well developed paddle-like exopodites on the trunk limbs along with its small size suggests that it was an effective swimmer with a strong power stroke, and that it probably had a nektobenthic mode of life, swimming close to the ocean floor. Given its delicate spinose endites on the limbs it likely only consumed soft food and organic particles. It is considered to be closely related to Retifacies from the same deposit with shared characters including a segmented tailspine. It has been placed as a member of Artiopoda, possibly along with Retifacies the earliest diverging lineage of the Trilobitomorpha.

References

Cambrian arthropods
Monotypic arthropod genera
Fossil taxa described in 2000
Prehistoric animals of China